Kara Mehmed Pasha (died March or April 1722) was an Ottoman statesman who served as the Ottoman governor of various provinces (eyalets) and sub-provinces (sanjaks). He was also a vizier.

Mehmed Pasha served as the Ottoman governor of Egypt Eyalet (1699–1704, 1712), Sanjak of Karasi (1706–1708), Sidon Eyalet (1708), Sanjak of Inebahti (1708–1710), Rumelia Eyalet (1710), Sanjak of Bender (1710–1712), Sanjak of Trabalus (1712–1714), Azov (1714–1717), Sanjak of Candia (1717–1718), Sanjak of Sakız (1718–1719), and Sanjak of Vidin (1719–1722). He died in office in Vidin in March or April 1722.

He had a mosque built in the neighborhood of Aksaray in Istanbul, in the capital of the Ottoman Empire. However, the Kara Mehmed Pasha Mosque was demolished and was only rediscovered in November 2012, when its former location was found to lie directly on modern-day trolley car tracks across the street from the Pertevniyal Valide Sultan Mosque in the neighborhood.

See also
 List of Ottoman governors of Egypt

References

17th-century births
1722 deaths
17th-century Ottoman governors of Egypt
18th-century Ottoman governors of Egypt
Ottoman governors of Egypt